Chengottukavu  is a village in Kozhikode district in the state of Kerala, India.

Railway Station
The nearest railway station is Chemanchery.

Demographics
 India census, Chengottukavu had a population of 25293 with 11856 males and 13437 females.

Transportation
Chengottukavu connects to other parts of India through Koyilandy town.  The nearest airports are at Kannur and Kozhikode.  The nearest railway station is at Koyilandy.  The national highway no.66 passes through Koyilandy and the northern stretch connects to Mangalore, Goa and Mumbai.  The southern stretch connects to Cochin and Trivandrum.  The eastern National Highway No.54 going through Kuttiady connects to Mananthavady, Mysore and Bangalore.

See also
 Moodadi
 Naduvannur
 Arikkulam
 Thikkodi
 Chemancheri
 Kappad
 Atholi
 Ulliyeri
 Cheekilode
 Nochad
 Koyilandy

References

External links

Koyilandy area